Läste is a village in Tapa Parish, Lääne-Viru County, in northeastern Estonia.

Estonian chemist Jaan Kalviste (1898–1936) was born on Mikko farm in Läste.

References

 

Villages in Lääne-Viru County
Kreis Jerwen